Bhuj Rudra Mata Air Force Base  is an Indian Air Force base, which shares its runway with Bhuj Airport at the town of Bhuj in Gujarat, India. It is part of South Western Air Command.

The base at Bhuj which suffered extensive damage during the 2001 Gujarat earthquake on 26 January 2001, now stands completely reconstructed. At a solemn ceremony, Air Marshal AR Ghandhi, AOC-in-C, South Western Air Command, inaugurated a special Memorial erected at the air base to pay respects to 30 'air warriors' and 68 family members of the IAF personnel who died in the tragedy. Later, the Air Marshal also inaugurated married accommodation, messes for the Airmen and officers and operational complexes rebuilt at the airbase.

When the earthquake devastated this region, Bhuj airbase became the nodal point where all immediate relief materials were flown in by special Air Force and other civil aircraft including those from foreign countries. Nearly 1,300 landings by relief aircraft belonging to various agencies were coordinated from 26 January to March 2001 by the personnel of the airbase. Despite the loss of their own comrades and near-and-dear ones, the 'air warriors' helped save thousands of lives.

Bhuj Air Force Base houses the 27 Wing.

The airbase today is again brimming with activities as the station, with new residential structures, has been equipped with all amenities such as playgrounds, parks, auditorium, swimming pool, shopping complex and an Air Force School. An arboriculture drive has also been launched to ensure greenery around the campus.

References
Bhuj Rudra Mata Air Force Base

Indian Air Force bases
Airports in Gujarat
Transport in Bhuj
Year of establishment missing